The X Factor is a British television singing talent series. It was broadcast from 2004 to 2018. The winners, runners-up and other contestants of the show have seen varied levels of success, but have gone on to produce a total of 42 number ones and numerous UK chart hits. Sales figures show that artists from the show have sold around 30 million singles and over 18 million albums. One Direction have sold more than 65 million records worldwide, making them the most successful act to have ever appeared on any country's version of The X Factor and one of the best-selling boy bands of all time.

The first eleven winners of the show—Steve Brookstein, Shayne Ward, Leona Lewis, Leon Jackson, Alexandra Burke, Joe McElderry, Matt Cardle, Little Mix, James Arthur, Sam Bailey and Ben Haenow—reached the top spot with their winner's singles, whilst 2015 winner Louisa Johnson only reached number 9, 2016 winner Matt Terry reached number 3, 2017 winners Rak-Su reached number 2, and 2018 winner Dalton Harris reached number 4. The winning contestant's single from 2004 to 2010 (and again in 2013 and 2014) was released in time for the end-of-year chart battle for the UK's Christmas number one, a spot which was gained in 2005, 2006, 2007, 2008, 2010, 2013 and 2014. Brookstein and McElderry both instead claimed the New Year's number one spot a week later in 2004 and 2009 respectively, while Little Mix achieved the top spot a week earlier in 2011. In 2012, Arthur achieved the number one spot a week earlier as well, but also claimed the New Year's number one spot, making him the first (and currently only) winner to regain the top spot on the charts.

In 2008, the contestants from the fifth series released a cover version of Mariah Carey's "Hero" to raise money for the charity Help for Heroes; the single charted at number one in the United Kingdom. In 2009, the contestants of that year released a cover of Michael Jackson's "You Are Not Alone", in 2010, they released a cover of David Bowie's "Heroes", and in 2011 they released a cover of "Wishing on a Star" featuring former contestants JLS and One Direction. The process was discontinued in 2012, although all winner's singles since 2012 have been released as charity singles.

Singles

Albums

See also

 Popstars (UK) discography
 Fame Academy discography
 Pop Idol discography
 The Voice UK discography

References

Lists of songs by reality television contestants